The Oliver Rice House, also called the Rice Homestead, is a historic home located at Mayfield in Fulton County, New York. Rice served in the American Revolutionary War under George Washington.

The main section of the house was built about 1810 and is a large, 2-story, five-bay, center-chimney frame dwelling enlarged and expanded in three phases through 1936.  A small -story wing constructed about 1790 was moved and appended to this house sometime between about 1810 and 1847. Also on the property is a 19th-century brick smokehouse and a garage and pumphouse dating to the early 20th century.

It was listed on the National Register of Historic Places in 1995.

References

External links

Mayfield Historical Society - operates the Oliver Rice Homestead

Houses on the National Register of Historic Places in New York (state)
Houses completed in 1790
Museums in Fulton County, New York
Historic house museums in New York (state)
Historical society museums in New York (state)
Houses in Fulton County, New York
National Register of Historic Places in Fulton County, New York